The Luambala is a river of Mozambique. It flows through Niassa Province in a northeast-southwest direction. The Luambala valley was surveyed during the Portuguese Nyasaland. The river was reported to have steep sides and a rock bed.

References

Rivers of Mozambique